Košarkaški klub Mladost, commonly referred to as KK Mladost Čačak, is a men's basketball club based in Čačak, Serbia. The club currently competes in the 4th-tier Second Regional League of Serbia.

History 
The club is founded on 6 February 1995 in Čačak, succeeding a basketball academy founded by coach Ratko Joksić in 1991. The club brought together young coaches such as Doborilo Jojić, Vladimir Androić, Dejan Tomić, Dragan Cvetković, among others.

Players

Coaches 

  Vladimir Androić
  Vladimir Zlatanović
  Mihailo Sušić

See also 
 KK Borac Čačak
 KK Čačak 94
 KK Železničar Čačak

References

External links
 
 Profile at srbijasport.net 
 Profile at eurobasket.com

Čačak
Sport in Čačak
Mladost 
Mladost